Nerea Camacho Ramos (born 15 May 1996) is a Spanish actress. Her first performance in the 2008 film Camino earned her the Goya Award for Best New Actress.

Biography 
Born on 15 May 1996 in Balanegra, province of Almería, Andalusia. Both of her parents were from Langreo and moved to Balanegra for work-related reasons. She began to train for theatrical plays when she was nine.

Camacho's debut as a film actress came in Javier Fesser's Camino (2008), where she played the leading character Camino, a 11-year old girl raised in an Opus Dei family who develops a terminal cancer. The performance earned her the Goya Award for Best New Actress in 2009 and opened the doors for her acting career.

Following her debut, she was cast in more main roles in feature films: she starred in Tres metros sobre el cielo (2010), the adaptation of the Federico Moccia's namesake novel, in which she played Dani, the younger sister of Babi (María Valverde). Also in 2010, she performed the role of Elena in the Pau Freixas' film Heroes.

She also starred in the 2011 drama La chispa de la vida (As Luck Would Have It), directed by Álex de la Iglesia, in which Camacho played Bárbara, one of the two children of the marriage formed by Luisa (Salma Hayek) and Roberto (José Mota). Together with her film activity, she also started in television, taking guest roles in series such as Los protegidos and El barco. 

She reprised the role of Daniela in Tengo ganas de ti (2012), the sequel to Tres metros sobre el cielo. 

She was given her first stable role in television as part of the cast of the limited series Bienvenidos al Lolita, aired in 2014 on Antena 3. She played Greta, a 16-year old girl who lives in the Lolita Cabaret surrounded by adults.

Camacho joined the cast of the Colombian telenovela La esclava blanca (The White Slave), a historical drama involving slave trade. She played the leading character Victoria Quintero, an orphan young woman raised by rebel slaves. She also appeared in the 2017 Mexican telenovela En tierras salvajes, playing Alejandra Rivelles Zavala, the love interest of Uriel Santana, the stable boy of the Otero family.

Camacho starred in a minor role in José Luis Cuerda's  (2018), a comedy set in a dystopia venturing into surrealism, playing Margarita, a role described as a sort of "choni from the future". In 2019, she appeared in the young-adult horror miniseries Terror.app, aired on Atresplayer Premium.

Filmography 
Films

Television

References

External links 
 
 
 

1996 births
Living people
Spanish film actresses
Spanish telenovela actresses
21st-century Spanish actresses
Spanish child actresses